Sarnen Nord railway station is a railway station in the municipality of Sarnen, in the Swiss canton of Obwalden. It is an intermediate stop on the  gauge Brünig line of the Zentralbahn. The station opened with the timetable change on 11 December 2016, following the completion of a double-tracking project between Sarnen and Kägiswil.

Services 
The following services stop at Sarnen Nord:

References

External links 
 

Railway stations in the canton of Obwalden
Zentralbahn stations
Railway stations in Switzerland opened in 2016